Caraș-Severin is a county (județ) of Romania on the border with Serbia. The majority of its territory lies within the historical region of Banat, with a few northeastern villages considered part of Transylvania. The county seat is Reșița. The Caraș-Severin county is part of the Danube–Criș–Mureș–Tisa Euroregion.

Name 
In Serbo-Croatian, it is known as Karaš Severin/Караш Северин or Karaš-Severinska županija, in Hungarian as Krassó-Szörény megye, in German as Kreis Karasch-Severin, and in Bulgarian as Караш-Северин (translit. Karash-Severin).

Demographics 
The county is part of the Danube-Kris-Mureș-Tisza euroregion.

In 2011, it had a population of 274,277 and a population density of 33.63/km2.

The majority of the population (89.23%) are Romanians. There are also Roma (2.74%), Croats (1.88%), Germans – Banat Swabians (1.11%), Serbs (1.82%), Hungarians (1.19%) and Ukrainians (0.94%).

Geography 
With 8,514 km2, it is the third largest county in Romania, after Timiș and Suceava counties. It is also the county through which the river Danube enters Romania.

The mountains make up 67% of the county's surface, including the Southern Carpathians range, with Banat Mountains, Țarcu-Godeanu Mountains and Cernei Mountains and elevations between 600 and 2100 meters. Transition hills between mountains and the Banat Plain lie in the western side of the county.

The Danube enters Romania in the vicinity of Baziaș, bordering Serbia. Timiș, Cerna, Caraș and Nera cross the county, some of them through spectacular valleys and gorges.

Neighbours 

 Hunedoara County and Gorj County to the east.
 Timiș County to the north.
 Mehedinți County to the southeast.
 Serbia to the southwest:
 Vojvodina Autonomous Province to the west – South Banat okrug.
 Bor District and Braničevo District to the south.

History and economy 
In 1718 the county was part of the Habsburg monarchy, part of the province of Banat. In 1771 the county seat, Reschitz (Reșița) became a modern industrial center under Austrian rule. The area received considerable attention due to its mining industry. In 1855, the entire Banat area, with its supplies of mineral deposits and timber, was transferred from the Austrian Treasury to a joint Austrian-French mining and railroad company named StEG. StEG built the Oravița-Baziaș line, Romania's oldest railroad track.

After World War I, StEG, Banat and most Austro-Hungarian property were taken over by a company named UDR. During the last years of World War II, when Romania was an ally of Nazi Germany, a partisan group, led by Ștefan Plavăț, was active in the mountainous area of the county. The arrival of the communist regime in Romania after World War II and that regime's campaign of nationalization of the mining industry brought tremendous social upheaval in the area.

Tourism 
Archaeological findings show the area has been populated since Paleolithic times. There is a County Museum of History in Reșița, displaying archeological artifacts, and, in the town of Ocna de Fier, the Constantin Gruiescu Mineralogical Collection. The county hosts the regional daffodil and lilac festivals in the Spring.
Sites worth visiting:
 Cheile Nerei – Beușinta National Park;
 Semenic – Cheile Carașului National Park;
 Domogled – Valea Cernei National Park;
 Danube Iron Gate National Park;
 Semenic resort;
 Băile Herculane resort.

Politics 
President of the County Council – Romeo-Dan Dunca (National Liberal Party)
Vice-presidents of the County Council – Dan Stan and Ovidiu Rădoi (both National Liberal Party)

The Caraș-Severin County Council, renewed at the 2020 local elections, consists of 30 counsellors, with the following party composition:

Administrative divisions 

Caraș-Severin County has 2 municipalities, 6 towns and 69 communes
Municipalities
Caransebeș
Reșița – capital city; population: 86,383 (as of 2006)

Towns
Anina
Băile Herculane
Bocșa
Moldova Nouă
Oravița
Oțelu Roșu

Communes
Armeniș
Bănia
Băuțar
Berliște
Berzasca
Berzovia
Bolvașnița
Bozovici
Brebu
Brebu Nou
Buchin
Bucoșnița
Carașova
Cărbunari
Ciclova Română
Ciuchici
Ciudanovița
Constantin Daicoviciu
Copăcele
Cornea
Cornereva
Coronini
Dalboșeț
Doclin
Dognecea
Domașnea
Eftimie Murgu
Ezeriș
Fârliug
Forotic
Gârnic
Glimboca
Goruia
Grădinari
Iablanița
Lăpușnicel
Lăpușnicu Mare
Luncavița
Lupac
Marga
Măureni
Mehadia
Mehadica
Naidăș
Obreja
Ocna de Fier
Păltiniș
Pojejena
Prigor
Răcășdia
Ramna
Rusca Montană
Sacu
Sasca Montană
Sichevița
Slatina-Timiș
Socol
Șopotu Nou
Târnova
Teregova
Ticvaniu Mare
Topleț
Turnu Ruieni
Văliug
Vărădia
Vermeș
Vrani
Zăvoi
Zorlențu Mare

Historic county

The territory of the county was transferred to the Romania from the Kingdom of Hungary in 1920 under the Treaty of Trianon. The county was located in the southwestern part of Greater Romania, in the south and east region of the Banat. The county seat was Lugoj. Its territory consisted entirely of the current territory of the county, but also parts of the current counties of Timiș, Arad, and Mehedinți. It bordered on the west with Timiș-Torontal County and the Kingdom of Yugoslavia, to the south with Yugoslavia, to the east with the counties Mehedinți and Hunedoara, and to the north by Arad County. Its territory corresponded to the former Hungarian division of Krassó-Szörény County. The county existed for seven years, being divided in 1926 into Caraș County and Severin County.

Administration
The county was divided administratively into fourteen districts (plăși). There were five urban municipalities (cities): Lugoj (capital), Caransebeș, Reșița, Oravița and Orșova.

Population 
According to the census data of 1920, the total population of the county was 424,254 inhabitants. The population density was 38 inhabitants/km2.

References

External links 

 
Counties of Romania
1919 establishments in Romania
1926 disestablishments in Romania
1940 establishments in Romania
1950 disestablishments in Romania
1968 establishments in Romania
States and territories established in 1919
States and territories disestablished in 1926
States and territories established in 1940
States and territories disestablished in 1950
States and territories established in 1968